Fataleka is a single-member constituency of the National Parliament of Solomon Islands. Located on the island of Malaita, it was established in 1993 when the National Parliament was expanded from 38 to 47 seats.

List of MPs

Election results

2019

2014

2010

2006

2001

1997

1993

References

Solomon Islands parliamentary constituencies
1993 establishments in the Solomon Islands
Constituencies established in 1993